Daniel Orsanic (born 11 June 1968) is a former professional  tennis player from Argentina. He was captain of the Argentina Davis Cup team that won the country's first title in 2016.

Playing career
Orsanic was a left-hander with a double handed backhand. He was primarily a doubles specialist with his best tournament results in singles reaching three quarterfinals in 1993 at Buenos Aires and twice in 1994 at Birmingham, Alabama and Båstad.

In doubles Orsanic won eight titles and was a finalist on seven occasions all of these performances were on clay. 1998 was his most successful year with two titles at Majorca and Kitzbühel and a finalist in Palermo, Mexico City, and Gstaad. His last title came in 2001 Palermo with Spaniard Tomás Carbonell. Orsanic retired as a player at the end of the 2003 season. He is of Croatian descent.

Coaching career
Orsanic was the former coach to Peruvian Luis Horna. He was also the team captain for Argentina when they won the 2007 World Team Cup in Düsseldorf. Orsanic was the former coach of José Acasuso, they separated before Roland Garros. He is now working with the Uruguayan Pablo Cuevas.

ATP career finals

Doubles: 15 (8 titles, 7 runner-ups)

ATP Challenger and ITF Futures finals

Singles: 4 (2–2)

Doubles: 22 (10–12)

Performance timelines

Singles

Doubles

Mixed Doubles

References

External links
 
 
 

Argentine male tennis players
Argentine people of Croatian descent
Tennis players from Buenos Aires
1969 births
Living people
20th-century Argentine people